你好 Mr. Siao! (NI HAO, Mr Siao!) (Mandarin for “Good Day, Mr Siao”) showing adult students from different ethnics in Malaysia learning Mandarin in a classroom setting. This locally produced series shows how non-Chinese and non-Mandarin-speaking Chinese learn Mandarin with hilarious outcomes. The series premiered on 15 April 2009, airing every Wednesday at 9:00pm on ntv7. A 2 CNY special episodes was aired during Chinese New Year 2010. The second season was premiered on 7 April 2010, acquiring its previous slot. This drama series mimics a British drama series named Mind Your English in 1978.

Synopsis
The owner of Dream Big International, Mr. Robert Toh is looking to expand his business and is aiming to the China market. He needs his “diamond-ranking” and “pearl-ranking” leaders to train and guide the China distributors and agents but most of them are not well-versed in Mandarin. So he gets a Mandarin lecturer to teach this selected group proper Mandarin.

Casts

Main Casts
in order of appearance
Auguste Kwan Teik Hooi 
Kee Thuan Chye 
Soo Wincci
Loo Aye Keng
Elvanna Raine
Steve Yap
Ling Tang
Tony Ong
Alvin Wong
Baki Zainal
Chai Jen
Ramasundran Rengan
Cindy Chen

Special Appearances

References

Chinese-language drama television series in Malaysia
Malaysian comedy television series
2009 Malaysian television series debuts
2010 Malaysian television series endings
2000s Malaysian television series
2010s Malaysian television series